The ovary is an organ in the female reproductive system that produces an ovum. When released, this travels down the fallopian tube into the uterus, where it may become fertilized by a sperm. There is an ovary found on each side of the body. The ovaries also secrete hormones that play a role in the menstrual cycle and fertility. The ovary progresses through many stages beginning in the prenatal period through menopause. It is also an endocrine gland because of the various hormones that it secretes.

Structure
The ovaries are considered the female gonads. Each ovary is whitish in color and located alongside the lateral wall of the uterus in a region called the ovarian fossa. The ovarian fossa is the region that is bounded by the external iliac artery and in front of the ureter and the internal iliac artery. This area is about 4 cm x 3 cm x 2 cm in size.

The ovaries are surrounded by a capsule, and have an outer cortex and an inner medulla. The capsule is of dense connective tissue and is known as the tunica albuginea.

Usually, ovulation occurs in one of the two ovaries releasing an egg each menstrual cycle.

The side of the ovary closest to the fallopian tube is connected to it by infundibulopelvic ligament, and the other side points downwards attached to the uterus via the ovarian ligament.

Other structures and tissues of the ovaries include the hilum.

Ligaments
The ovaries lie within the peritoneal cavity, on either side of the uterus, to which they are attached via a fibrous cord called the ovarian ligament. The ovaries are uncovered in the peritoneal cavity but are tethered to the body wall via the suspensory ligament of the ovary which is a posterior extension of the broad ligament of the uterus. The part of the broad ligament of the uterus that covers the ovary is known as the mesovarium.

The ovarian pedicle is made up part of the fallopian tube, mesovarium, ovarian ligament, and ovarian blood vessels.

Microanatomy
The surface of the ovaries is covered with a membrane consisting of a lining of simple cuboidal-to-columnar shaped mesothelium, called the germinal epithelium.

The outer layer is the ovarian cortex, consisting of ovarian follicles and stroma in between them. Included in the follicles are the cumulus oophorus, membrana granulosa (and the granulosa cells inside it), corona radiata, zona pellucida, and primary oocyte. Theca of follicle, antrum and liquor folliculi are also contained in the follicle. Also in the cortex is the corpus luteum derived from the follicles. The innermost layer is the ovarian medulla. It can be hard to distinguish between the cortex and medulla, but follicles are usually not found in the medulla.

Follicular cells are flat epithelial cells that originate from surface epithelium covering the ovary. They are surrounded by granulosa cells that have changed from flat to cuboidal and proliferated to produce a stratified epithelium.

The ovary also contains blood vessels and lymphatics.

Function

At puberty, the ovary begins to secrete increasing levels of hormones. Secondary sex characteristics begin to develop in response to the hormones. The ovary changes structure and function beginning at puberty. Since the ovaries are able to regulate hormones, they also play an important role in pregnancy and fertility. When egg cells (oocytes) are released from the Fallopian tube, a variety of feedback mechanisms stimulate the endocrine system which cause hormone levels to change. These feedback mechanisms are controlled by the hypothalamus and pituitary glands. Messages or signals from the hypothalamus are sent to the pituitary gland. In turn, the pituitary gland releases hormones to the ovaries. From this signaling, the ovaries release their own hormones.

Gamete production 

The ovaries are the site of production and periodical release of egg cells, the female gametes. In the ovaries, the developing egg cells (or oocytes) mature in the fluid-filled follicles. Typically, only one oocyte develops at a time, but others can also mature simultaneously. Follicles are composed of different types and number of cells according to the stage of their maturation, and their size is indicative of the stage of oocyte development.

When an oocyte completes its maturation in the ovary, a surge of luteinizing hormone is secreted by the pituitary gland which stimulates the release of the oocyte through the rupture of the follicle, a process called ovulation. The follicle remains functional and reorganizes into a corpus luteum, which secretes progesterone in order to prepare the uterus for an eventual implantation of the embryo.

Hormone secretion
At maturity, ovaries secrete estrogen, androgen, inhibin, and progestogen. In women before menopause, 50% of testosterone is produced by the ovaries and released directly into the blood stream. The other 50% of testosterone in the blood stream is made from conversion of the adrenal pre-androgens ( DHEA and androstenedione) to testosterone in other parts of the body. Estrogen is responsible for the appearance of secondary sex characteristics for females at puberty and for the maturation and maintenance of the reproductive organs in their mature functional state. Progesterone prepares the uterus for pregnancy, and the mammary glands for lactation. Progesterone functions with estrogen by promoting menstrual cycle changes in the endometrium.

Ovarian aging
As women age, they experience a decline in reproductive performance leading to menopause.  This decline is tied to a decline in the number of ovarian follicles. Although about 1 million oocytes are present at birth in the human ovary, only about 500 (about 0.05%) of these ovulate, and the rest are wasted.  The decline in ovarian reserve appears to occur at a constantly increasing rate with age, and leads to nearly complete exhaustion of the reserve by about age 52.  As ovarian reserve and fertility decline with age, there is also a parallel increase in pregnancy failure and meiotic errors resulting in chromosomally abnormal conceptions. The ovarian reserve and fertility perform optimally around 20–30 years of age. Around 45 years of age, the menstrual cycle begins to change and the follicle pool decreases significantly.  The events that lead to ovarian aging remain unclear. The variability of aging could include environmental factors, lifestyle habits or genetic factors.

Women with an inherited mutation in the DNA repair gene BRCA1 undergo menopause prematurely, suggesting that naturally occurring DNA damages in oocytes are repaired less efficiently in these women, and this inefficiency leads to early reproductive failure.  The BRCA1 protein plays a key role in a type of DNA repair termed homologous recombinational repair that is the only known cellular process that can accurately repair DNA double-strand breaks. Titus et al. showed that DNA double-strand breaks accumulate with age in humans and mice in primordial follicles.  Primordial follicles contain oocytes that are at an intermediate (prophase I) stage of meiosis.  Meiosis is the general process in eukaryotic organisms by which germ cells are formed, and it is likely an adaptation for removing DNA damages, especially double-strand breaks, from germ line DNA (see Meiosis and Origin and function of meiosis). Homologous recombinational repair is especially promoted during meiosis.  Titus et al. also found that expression of 4 key genes necessary for homologous recombinational repair of DNA double-strand breaks (BRCA1, MRE11, RAD51 and ATM) decline with age in the oocytes of humans and mice.  They hypothesized that DNA double-strand break repair is vital for the maintenance of oocyte reserve and that a decline in efficiency of repair with age plays a key role in ovarian aging. A study identified 290 genetic determinants of ovarian ageing, also found that DNA damage response processes are implicated and suggests that possible effects of extending fertility in women would improve bone health, reduce risk of type 2 diabetes and increase the risk of hormone-sensitive cancers.

A variety of testing methods can be used in order to determine fertility based on maternal age. Many of these tests measure levels of hormones FSH, and GnrH. Methods such as measuring AMH (anti-mullerian) hormone levels, and AFC (antral follicule count) can predict ovarian aging. AMH levels serve as an indicator of ovarian aging since the quality of ovarian follicles can be determined.

Clinical significance

Ovarian diseases can be classified as endocrine disorders or as a disorders of the reproductive system.

If the egg fails to release from the follicle in the ovary an ovarian cyst may form. Small ovarian cysts are common in healthy women. Some women have more follicles than usual (polycystic ovary syndrome), which inhibits the follicles to grow normally and this will cause cycle irregularities.

Society and culture

Cryopreservation
Cryopreservation of ovarian tissue, often called ovarian tissue cryopreservation, is of interest to women who want to preserve their reproductive function beyond the natural limit, or whose reproductive potential is threatened by cancer therapy, for example in hematologic malignancies or breast cancer. The procedure is to take a part of the ovary and carry out slow freezing before storing it in liquid nitrogen whilst therapy is undertaken. Tissue can then be thawed and implanted near the fallopian, either orthotopic (on the natural location) or heterotopic (on the abdominal wall), where it starts to produce new eggs, allowing normal conception to take place. A study of 60 procedures concluded that ovarian tissue harvesting appears to be safe. The ovarian tissue may also be transplanted into mice that are immunocompromised (SCID mice) to avoid graft rejection, and tissue can be harvested later when mature follicles have developed.

History
In former centuries, medical authors, for example Galen, referred to a woman's ovaries as "female testes".

Other animals

Birds have only one functional ovary (the left), while the other remains vestigial. Ovaries in females are analogous to testes in males, in that they are both gonads and endocrine glands. Ovaries of some kind are found in the female reproductive system of many animals that employ sexual reproduction, including invertebrates. However, they develop in a very different way in most invertebrates than they do in vertebrates, and are not truly homologous.

Many of the features found in human ovaries are common to all vertebrates, including the presence of follicular cells, tunica albuginea, and so on. However, many species produce a far greater number of eggs during their lifetime than do humans, so that, in fish and amphibians, there may be hundreds, or even millions of fertile eggs present in the ovary at any given time. In these species, fresh eggs may be developing from the germinal epithelium throughout life. Corpora lutea are found only in mammals, and in some elasmobranch fish; in other species, the remnants of the follicle are quickly resorbed by the ovary. In birds, reptiles, and monotremes, the egg is relatively large, filling the follicle, and distorting the shape of the ovary at maturity.

Amphibians and reptiles have no ovarian medulla; the central part of the ovary is a hollow, lymph-filled space.

The ovary of teleosts is also often hollow, but in this case, the eggs are shed into the cavity, which opens into the oviduct. Although most normal female vertebrates have two ovaries, this is not the case in all species. In most birds and in platypuses, the right ovary never matures, so that only the left is functional. (Exceptions include the kiwi and some, but not all raptors, in which both ovaries persist.) In some elasmobranchs, only the right ovary develops fully. In the primitive jawless fish, and some teleosts, there is only one ovary, formed by the fusion of the paired organs in the embryo.

Additional images

See also

 Ovarian reserve
 Folliculogenesis
 Oophorectomy
Ovarian drilling
Artificial ovary
Ovary culture

References

Bibliography

External links

 From the American Medical Association 
 Merck Online Medical Library: Female Reproductive System

Organs (anatomy)
Endocrine system
Pelvis
Human female reproductive system
Women's health
Gynaecology